Paniscomima is a genus of wasps in family Rhopalosomatidae. Members of this family are parasitic of crickets.

Taxonomy
The genus contains the following species:
Paniscomima abnormis (Morley, 1910) 
Paniscomima angelae Guidotti, 2007 
Paniscomima bekilyi (Berland, 1951) 
Paniscomima curta Townes, 1977 
Paniscomima darlingi Guidotti, 2007 
Paniscomima erlangeriana Enderlein, 1904 
Paniscomima kilombero Lohrmann, 2011 
Paniscomima lottacontinua Guidotti, 2007 
Paniscomima mulanje Lohrmann, 2011 
Paniscomima opposita Townes, 1977 
Paniscomima paropposita Guidotti, 2007 
Paniscomima rufoantennata (Berland, 1951) 
Paniscomima seyrigi (Berland, 1951)

References

Rhopalosomatidae
Hymenoptera genera
Taxa named by Günther Enderlein